The Wait Is Over is the second album by the Southern rap group 69 Boyz, released in 1998.  It was a moderate success, peaking at number 114 on the Billboard Hot 200; however, it didn't chart as well as the group's previous album, 199Quad.  The album contained the hit single "Woof Woof", which peaked at number 31 on the Billboard Hot 100 and was also featured on the soundtrack to the film Dr. Dolittle. Jay Ski and C.C. Lemonhead (the Quad City DJ's) produced many of the songs.

Track listing 
"Intro" - 0:06
"Roll Wit It" - 2:57
"Sticky" - 2:59
"Get on Your Feet" - 5:47
"Freak You Down 2 da Bass" - 4:13
"What's a Catch 22" - 1:47
"Catch 22" - 2:01
"Backseat" - 2:18
"Da Set (Intro)" - 0:11
"Da Set Pt. 2" - 5:34
"Roll Call (Intro)" - 0:08
"Roll Call" - 4:21
"Strip Club (Intro)" - 0:19
"Strip Club Luv" - 4:39
"Do You Want It? (Intro)" - 0:22
"Do You Want It, Baby?" - 2:18
"Beep Beep" - 3:09
"Wasn't Me" - 3:42
"Wilbert" - 0:38
"ICU" - 3:58
"Woof Woof" - 4:31
"2 A.M. (Intro)" - 0:10
"2 A.M. (Whatcha Doin'?)" - 4:01
"Girls Just Wanna" - 3:32
"I Need You (Skit)" - 0:06
"I Need You '98" - 4:09
"One God, One Judge" - 3:23

Strip Club Luv & Strip Club Luv (intro) sampled the Isley Brothers 1982 All In My Lover Eyes

References

69 Boyz albums
1998 albums
Big Beat Records (American record label) albums